Andrew Ryan is an Australian actor best known for his performance as Chris Lang in the film of Tomorrow, When the War Began (2010) and as one of the stars of The Jesters. Originally from Brisbane, he played roles in the films All My Friends Are Leaving Brisbane and Jucy which were written specifically for him, and starred in a TV series, The Future Machine (2010) and Love Child.
Ryan portrayed INXS keyboardist and main composer Andrew Farriss in the telemovie INXS: Never Tear Us Apart (2014) he also received an AACTA award nomination for this role.

Selected credits
All My Friends Are Leaving Brisbane (2007)
The Jesters (2009-2011) (TV series)
Jucy (2010)
The Future Machine (2010) (TV series)
Tomorrow, When the War Began (2010)
Lemon Tree Passage (2013)
Love Child (2014–2016)

References

External links

 Australian male actors
 Year of birth missing (living people)
 Living people